The Clarendon Institute (or the Clarendon Press Institute) is a building in Walton Street, central Oxford, England.

In 1891, Horace Hart (1840–1916) of the Clarendon Press (now Oxford University Press) proposed an institute to provide a place providing relaxation and further education facilities for staff at the Press. He planned a gymnasium, library, and reading room, and to provide teaching of French, German, Greek, Latin, mathematics, and shorthand.

The building was designed by H. W. Moore and built during 1892–93. It cost £5,000 to build.

The Clarendon Institute now houses the Oxford Centre for Hebrew and Jewish Studies, (an independent centre of the University of Oxford), the British Inter-University China Centre, the Centre for Linguistics & Philology, and the Leopold Muller Memorial Library.
 
In 2016, the building suffered a fire.

References

1892 establishments in England
Buildings and structures completed in 1893
Buildings and structures in Oxford
Buildings and structures of the University of Oxford
Libraries in Oxford
Libraries of the University of Oxford
Oxford University Press